Xiamen, or Amoy, is a city on the southeast coast of China.

Amoy may also refer to:
Amoy dialect, a dialect of Hokkien Chinese, which is part of the Southern Min group of Chinese dialects
 Amoy Food, a manufacturer of sauces, condiments and processed foods
Amoy Properties, now Hang Lung Properties, a property developer in Hong Kong

People 
Amoy Brown (born 1996), Jamaican footballer

See also
Amoy Street (disambiguation)
Åmøy, an island in Norway